Chadi Riad Dnanou (born 17 June 2003) is a professional footballer who plays as a centre-back for Barcelona Atlètic. Born in Spain, he is a youth international for Morocco.

Club career
Born in Palma de Mallorca, Balearic Islands to Moroccan parents, Riad represented CD Atlético Rafal, RCD Mallorca (two stints) and CD San Francisco before agreeing to a three-year deal with FC Barcelona in February 2019, effective as of July. In 2020, he moved to CE Sabadell FC on loan for one year, being assigned to the Juvenil A squad.

Riad made his senior – and first team – debut on 16 December 2020, starting in a 2–0 away win against CD Ibiza Islas Pitiusas, for the season's Copa del Rey. His Segunda División debut occurred the following 11 January, as he came on as a late substitute for Aleix Coch in a 1–1 home draw against CD Lugo.

The summer of 2022, Riad was promoted to Barcelona Atlètic, where he scored the winning goal on the season-opener match, against Castellón.

International career 
On 13 March 2023, Riad was called up to the full squad by manager Walid Regragui, for friendlies against Brazil and Peru.

Career statistics

Club

References

External links

2003 births
Living people
Footballers from Palma de Mallorca
Moroccan footballers
Morocco youth international footballers
Spanish footballers
Spanish sportspeople of Moroccan descent
Association football defenders
Segunda División players
CE Sabadell FC footballers
RCD Mallorca players
FC Barcelona players